2019 Pokhara Sports Award is the second biggest sport award of Nepal. This is the 4th Pokhara Sports Award.

Males

Females

Other
Lifetime Achievement Award - Chittda Bahadur Gurung: Boxing

See also
2019 Pulsar Sports Award

References

Nepalese awards
Sport in Nepal
2019 in Nepalese sport